Adiyakkamangalam is a village panchayat located in the south Indian state of Tamil Nadu. Located at 5 km from Tiruvarur (East), 15 km from Nagappattinam, it is east border of Tiruvarur district.

Etymology 
It is a home to many Sufis too. The word "Adiyakkamangalam" stems from two words "Adiyaarku Mangalam (அடியார்க்கு மங்களம்)" meaning "Auspicious for the disciples" referring to the various Sufi saints entombed in this place.

Pin Code: 611101
STD Code: 04366
District: Thiruvarur

External links
http://www.adiyakkamangalam.com/
http://wikimapia.org/1778709/Adiyakkamangalam
http://indiarailinfo.com/station/map/6729

References 

 

Villages in Tiruvarur district